Bobby Joe Hooper (born December 22, 1946) is a retired professional basketball point guard who spent one season in the American Basketball Association (ABA) as a member of the Indiana Pacers. He was drafted out of University of Dayton by the New York Knicks in the eighth round of the 1968 NBA draft, but did not play for them.

High school
Hooper graduated from Simon Kenton High School in Lees Creek, Ohio.

University of Dayton
Hooper was a three-year letter-winner and starter at Dayton.

He played as a junior point guard for the 1966–67 Dayton Flyers team that played in the NCAA Basketball Championship game. They defeated  North Carolina Tar Heels men's basketball 76–62 in the national semifinal game before losing to UCLA, 79–64. In the championship game, Hooper tallied 6 points, 5 rebounds and 2 assists.

With Hooper at the point, the Flyers reached the NCAA Sweet 16 in 1965–66, and the NIT Championship Game in 1967–68. He scored 1,059 career points, and set school records (since surpassed) in consecutive free throws made with 34 and career free throw percentage at .835.

He was named to the 1967 All-Mideast regional team and the 1968 All-NIT team.

Hooper was elected to the University of Dayton Athletic Hall of Fame in 1989. He was also named to UD's All-Century team in 2004.

Indiana Pacers
Hooper played professionally for one season in the American Basketball Association (ABA). He was in 54 games, averaging 5.0 points, 2.6 assists and 2 rebounds per game. He averaged 17.7 minutes per game. In the ABA playoffs, he played in 16 games, averaging 4.8 points, 2.8 assists and 2.4 rebounds per game.

His high-point game in the regular season was 14 against the Oakland Oaks; his high game in the playoffs was 15, also against Oakland.

References

External links

1946 births
Living people
American men's basketball players
Basketball players from Ohio
Dayton Flyers men's basketball players
Indiana Pacers players
New York Knicks draft picks
People from Clinton County, Ohio
Point guards